Qafqaz və Merkuri cəmiyyətinin paroxodunun limandan yola düşməsi(Departure of the steamer of the Caucasus and Mercury Society from the port) is one of the earliest films ever produced in the cinema of Azerbaijan directed by Azeri cinema pioneer Alexandre Michon. It was released in the summer of 1898.

The film was shot on 35mm.

See also
List of Azerbaijani films: 1898-1919

Azerbaijani silent films
1898 films
Azerbaijani black-and-white films
Films of the Russian Empire